General Napier may refer to:

Charles James Napier (1782–1853), British Army general
Charles Scott Napier (1899–1946), British Army major general
George Thomas Napier (1784–1855), British Army lieutenant general
Lennox Napier (1928–2020), British Army major general
Robert Napier (British Army officer, died 1766), British Army lieutenant general
Thomas Napier (British Army officer) (1790–1863), British Army general
Robert Napier, 1st Baron Napier of Magdala (1810–1890), British Indian Army general

See also
Attorney General Napier (disambiguation)